Francis Kasonde (born 1 September 1986) is a Zambian professional footballer who plays for Mufulira Wanderers. Kasonde mainly plays as a centre-back but also can play as a defensive midfielder or as a right-back.

Club career
Kasonde has played for Power Dynamos F.C. in Kitwe, Zambia and Omani side Al-Suwaiq Club.

In June 2017, Kasonde signed a six-month contract with Malaysia Premier League side Sabah. On 30 June 2017, Kasonde made his debut in a 1–0 victory during league match over PDRM.

International career
Kasonde is also a regular member of the Zambian national team from 2005 until 2013. He was the key of the Zambian team that won the 2012 African Cup of Nations. He earned his international debut in 2005 and scored his first goal against Egypt in a 1–1 draw.

Honours
Zambia
Africa Cup of Nations: 2012

References

External links
 
 

1986 births
Living people
Association football defenders
Zambian footballers
Zambia international footballers
Zambian expatriate footballers
Expatriate footballers in Saudi Arabia
Expatriate footballers in Israel
Expatriate footballers in India
Suwaiq Club players
Al-Hazem F.C. players
TP Mazembe players
Hapoel Ra'anana A.F.C. players
Salgaocar FC players
ZESCO United F.C. players
Sabah F.C. (Malaysia) players
Power Dynamos F.C. players
Mufulira Wanderers F.C. players
Israeli Premier League players
Saudi Professional League players
Expatriate footballers in Oman
Zambian expatriate sportspeople in Oman
Expatriate footballers in the Democratic Republic of the Congo
Zambian expatriate sportspeople in the Democratic Republic of the Congo
2002 African Cup of Nations players
2008 Africa Cup of Nations players
2010 Africa Cup of Nations players
2012 Africa Cup of Nations players
2013 Africa Cup of Nations players
Africa Cup of Nations-winning players
2009 African Nations Championship players
Zambia A' international footballers